Kriukiv Railway Car Manufacturing Plant (KVBZ) is a large industrial company in Kremenchuk, Ukraine, manufacturing locomotives and multiple unit trains.

History 
The foundation for the first buildings of the Krukiv Railway Car Manufacturing Plant was laid in 1869. As for 1900 there have been working 400 workers, who provided repairs for 120 freight and 20 passenger cars per month.

Production

Passenger
High speed interregional train EKr-1 Tarpan
High speed interregional train DPKr-2
High speed interregional train DPKr-3
Passenger coaches 779 series
Passenger coaches 788 series

Products for Metro
Front metro car mod. 81-7021
Intermediate metro car mod.81-7037
Intermediate metro car mod.81-7022
Front metro car mod. 81-7036

Military vehicles
 I-52 Mine layer vehicle

Formerly
 GSP 55
 PMM 2M

Metalworks

Gallery

References

External links 

Kriukiv Railway Car Building Works official website (eng.)

Rolling stock manufacturers of Ukraine
Ukrainian brands
Vehicle manufacturing companies established in 1896
Kremenchuk
Economy of Kremenchuk
Buildings and structures in Poltava Oblast
Manufacturing companies of the Soviet Union
Manufacturing plants in Ukraine
1896 establishments in the Russian Empire